AffrontTheater is a theatre group active in Salzburg, Austria.

References

Theatres in Salzburg